Lacanobia is a genus of moths in the family Noctuidae.

Species

 Lacanobia aliena (Hübner, [1809])
 Lacanobia altyntaghi Gyulai & Ronkay, 1998
 Lacanobia atlantica (Grote, 1874)
 Lacanobia behouneki Hreblay & Plante, 1996
 Lacanobia blenna (Hübner, [1824])
 Lacanobia contigua – Beautiful brocade (Denis & Schiffermüller, 1775)
 Lacanobia contrastata (Bryk, 1942)
 Lacanobia dentata (Kononenko, 1981)
 Lacanobia grandis (Guenée, 1852)
 Lacanobia kirghisa Gyulai & Ronkay, 1998
 Lacanobia mista (Staudinger, 1889)
 Lacanobia mongolica Behounek, 1992
 Lacanobia nevadae (Grote, 1876)
 Lacanobia oleracea – Bright-line brown-eye (Linnaeus, 1758)
 Lacanobia praedita (Hübner, [1813])
 Lacanobia radix (Walker, [1857]) (=Lacanobia desperata (Smith, 1891))
 Lacanobia softa (Staudinger, 1897)
 Lacanobia splendens (Hübner, [1808])
 Lacanobia suasa – Dog's tooth (Denis & Schiffermüller, 1775)
 Lacanobia subjuncta (Grote & Robinson, 1868)
 Lacanobia thalassina – Pale-shouldered brocade (Hufnagel, 1766)
 Lacanobia w-latinoides Gyulai & Ronkay, 1998
 Lacanobia w-latinum – Light brocade (Hufnagel, 1766)

References
 Lacanobia at funet.fi
 Natural History Museum Lepidoptera genus database

External links
 
 

 
Hadenini